Jessica Michault is an American  fashion journalist and is the Executive Editor of ODDA magazine.

Biography
Born in San Francisco, Michault studied Political Science at Dickinson College. 

Prior to becoming Nowfashion's editor-in-chief in 2012, Michault worked for 16 years at the International Herald Tribune under Suzy Menkes as the newspaper's Online Style Editor. She also contributes to France 24's culture chronicles with a fashion segment.

In 2013, she was included in the inaugural Business of Fashion 500, a curated list of the fashion industry's most influential members.

Publications 
 First Christian Dior collection by Raf Simons, NOWFASHION, 2 July 2012 
 Profile of Jessica Michault by Business of Fashion, Business of Fashion, October 2013
 Jessica Michault contribution to Punk on the Runway on SHOWSTUDIO, SHOWSTUDIO, June 2013
 Colorful Leggings - Vogue.it, Vogue Italia, 27 January 2011

References 

French journalists
American expatriates in France
American fashion journalists
Living people
International Herald Tribune people
French women writers
American women journalists
Year of birth missing (living people)
21st-century American women